Mawes is a Papuan language of Indonesia.

Usher (2020) proposes that it may be related to the Kwerbic languages. Foley (2018) classifies Mawes as a language isolate, and so does Hammarström (2010).

Pronouns
Pronouns are:

{| 
!  !! sg !! pl
|-
! 1
| kidam || inim
|-
! 2
| nam || nɛm
|-
! 3
| ɛbɛ || mia
|}

Basic vocabulary
Basic vocabulary of Mawes listed in Foley (2018):

{| 
|+ Mawes basic vocabulary
! gloss !! Mawes
|-
| ‘bird’ || ikinin
|-
| ‘blood’ || wɛrɛi
|-
| ‘bone’ || tuan
|-
| ‘ear’ || bɛr
|-
| ‘eat’ || nan
|-
| ‘egg’ || siwin
|-
| ‘eye’ || nonsum
|-
| ‘fire’ || kani
|-
| ‘leg, foot’ || yaʔ
|-
| ‘louse’ || sene
|-
| ‘name’ || dimanɛ
|-
| ‘one’ || mɛndakai
|-
| ‘see’ || nomo
|-
| ‘sky’ || kowan
|-
| ‘stone’ || fɛt
|-
| ‘sun’ || ɛsar
|-
| ‘tooth’ || wan
|-
| ‘tree’ || dengkin
|-
| ‘two’ || yakɛneu
|-
| ‘water’ || bo
|-
| ‘woman’ || yei
|}

The following basic vocabulary words are from Voorhoeve (1975),, as cited in the Trans-New Guinea database:

{| class="wikitable sortable"
! gloss !! Mawes
|-
| head || defar
|-
| hair || tere
|-
| eye || nonsom
|-
| tooth || wan
|-
| leg || ija
|-
| dog || wede
|-
| pig || was
|-
| bird || ikinin
|-
| egg || siwin
|-
| blood || werei
|-
| bone || tuan
|-
| skin || dukunen
|-
| tree || deŋkin
|-
| man || ke
|-
| sun || esar
|-
| water || bo
|-
| fire || kani
|-
| stone || feyt
|-
| name || dimane
|-
| eat || nano
|-
| one || mendakai
|-
| two || yakenew
|}

Sentences
Of the few sentences that have been documented for Mawes, some example sentences are:

Further reading
Wambaliau, Theresia. 2006. Survey Report on the Mawes Language in Papua, Indonesia. (in Indonesian). Unpublished manuscript. Jayapura: SIL Indonesia.
Hammarström, Harald. 2010. The genetic position of the Mawes language. Paper presented at the Workshop on the Languages of Papua 2. Manokwari, Indonesia, 8–12 February 2010.

References

External links
Rosetta Project: Mawes Swadesh list

Foja Range languages
Languages of western New Guinea
Language isolates of New Guinea